The second presidency of Rafael Caldera took place from 1994 to 1999. Caldera had previously been President from 1969 to 1974.

Presidency
In his second presidency, Caldera included politicians from other political backgrounds who supported his candidacy in his cabinet, like some representatives of MAS party, Teodoro Petkoff at the Ministry of the Central Office of Coordination and Planning, and Pompeyo Márquez at the Border Ministry, as well as some independents in other ministries. In any case the support of the MAS and other parties were fundamental to approve some laws in the National Congress in his first years of government, due to his own party having few seats in Congress. On 18 December 1994 he inaugurated the Plaza Venezuela – El Valle section of the Caracas Metro which had been initiated by previous governments. In 1996, he received Pope John Paul II on his second visit to Venezuela, when he blessed the prisoners of the Catia Prison, on the west side of Caracas (After this visit, the building was demolished). On 12 October 1997 he received U.S. President Bill Clinton, in November of the same year Margarita Island hosted the Seventh Ibero-American Conference. In June 1998, the Inaugural meeting of the XXVIII General Assembly of the Organization of American States was held in Caracas.

Economic crisis

In the first year of his second presidency, Caldera was faced with a major financial crisis (Venezuelan banking crisis of 1994) that began with the failure of Banco Latino during the acting presidency of Ramón José Velásquez, continued with the failure of more than ten banks, and culminated with the loss of deposits. Money given by the government to the banks curtailed government spending in other areas, affecting thousands of people and creating a serious imbalance in the Venezuelan economy.

The confidence and credibility of Venezuelans and foreigners at the financial institutions were affected seriously. More than seventy thousand medium and small companies went bankrupt, fundamentally due to the exchange rate regime imposed by the government, which made it difficult to obtain the currency to acquire intermediate goods. The prices of food, clothes and transport rose without control, impoverishing a greater number of Venezuelans.

Caldera also had to handle a vertiginous inflationary spiral and a parallel reduction of the Forex reserves, employees generously for the support of the bolívar in front of the U.S. dollar. On 27 June, he announced the temporary suspension of some constitutional guarantees, fundamentally related to the private property and the free economic activity, to allow control of the exchange market, the banking system and prices by the State. The financial organizations bankrupted by the draining of deposits and those affected by speculative practices went to be adjusted by the State.  In fact, the Central Bank of Venezuela announced the suspension of all its transaction in dollars. These economic measures were tolerated by the mass media and the international community, but not by the Venezuelan people.

Although Caldera promised during his campaign never to accept the help of the International Monetary Fund, his government had to rescind the vow, due to the economic crisis and bad management. The effect of the interventionist practice on the economy of Venezuela caused Caldera to announce the Agenda Venezuela (Venezuela Agenda) programme, which promised to restore the macroeconomic balance and to beat inflation. He applied liberalization measures in agreement with the recommendations of the IMF that he had previously resisted. The bolívar was devalued by 70%, the exchange rate regime was imposed, fuel prices were increased by 800%, rates of interest were liberalized, and the process of privatization was continued.  His program was welcomed by the IMF, but not by the country. Demonstrations and disturbances among the  population were frequent.

In 1997, a tripartite commission, consisting of representatives of industrialists, workers and the Government, assumed the reform of the regime of social benefits, and the deep revision of the labor law. The tripartite commission created a system of social benefits that anticipated, among other things, the annual payment and the cease of the labor performance, at the same time, five subsystems of social security with the purpose of improving the Government's activity, at the resolution of the basic problems of the Venezuelan workers.

Also during the second Caldera presidency, the process of Apertura Petrolera began with the purpose of increasing the involvement of the private sector, national and international, in the operation, exploration and refinement of petroleum and natural gas. The worldwide oil market crisis negatively influenced this process.

Due to differences with his coalition partners such as MAS, Caldera looked for the support of AD in Congress. Some AD members entered the Ministerial cabinet.

Amnesty to the 1992 coup participants 
In 1994 Caldera fulfilled a promise made during the presidential campaign and pardoned the military figures involved in the 1992 Venezuelan coup d'état attempts. Many of these, once liberated, grouped in the political party MVR, under the leadership of Hugo Chávez, who ultimately, after several years in the political wilderness, won the 1998 presidential elections. That election saw the comprehensive defeat of Acción Democrática and COPEI, which had alternated in government for 35 years (from 1959 to 1994), and which now lost their influence on the Venezuelan political scene.

Cabinet

References

See also 
Rafael Caldera
First Presidency of Rafael Caldera
Presidents of Venezuela

History of Venezuela
Rafael Caldera
Caldera, Rafael